Rajshahi Medical College (RMC)  is a public medical school located in Rajshahi, Bangladesh. The college is affiliated to Rajshahi Medical University. It was the second such institution in erstwhile East Pakistan after Dhaka Medical College. It has a large hospital which is the central provider for advanced health care in the northern part of Bangladesh.

History
After the separation of East Bengal from India in 1947 the people of Rajshahi region were deprived of medical education and healthcare facilities. In 1949 some renowned persons of civil society and political persons involved in administration took initiative to establish a private medical school in Rajshahi city. Initially they launched LMF (Licentiate of Medical Faculty) diploma course under State Medical Faculty Dhaka. Eighty students were admitted in the first batch.
In 1954, erstwhile Pakistan government converted it to government medical college. In 1958, it was launched as a complete college. It is the first medical college in northern part of Bangladesh. The first head of department of Anatomy and Physiology were respectively Lieutenant Colonel Gias Uddin Ahmed who was the first principal of this college and Professor Dr. Nayeb Ali. There were 43 students in the first batch including 2 female students and only 5 college staffs. The college and hospital premises are set up on 90 acres of land. The three storied 530 bed hospital was built in 1965 which included medicine, surgery and gynaecology-obstetrics Department. This hospital premises stands on 60 acres of land which was agricultural farm before. 20 bed Infectious disease hospital, leprosy control centre and 150 bed Sadar hospital were affiliated with this hospital. Henceforth, Sadar hospital was converted to dental unit.
At present MBBS, BDS and postgraduate course on different subjects are running in this college. BDS course was launched in 1992 and postgraduate course in 1998. General Medical Council of Great Britain recognised this medical college on 1 July 1992.
Many doctors and students of this college participated in independence war of Bangladesh in 1971. A Shahid Minar was built in front of administrative building in 1974.

College infrastructure

There are four galleries with computer multimedia projector, nine laboratories, two museums, two dissection rooms, one autopsy room, one library and two common rooms for students.
A new pharmacology building was built to the east side of the main premises in 1990. To the east of this building, a magnificent, modern, sophisticated auditorium was built in 1995 which is air-conditioned and contains 1000 seats. It is known as Kaisar Rahman Chowdhury Auditorium.
A new building for forensic medicine has been built recently to north-east side of the main building. It was launched in 2010. Besides, there is a nursing institute in the college premises.
In the college library, there are approximately 19500 books including both new and old editions and 60 medical journals of both home and abroad. Medical education unit of library provides with all modern facilities with internet browsing. The Research cell of college helps both students and doctors in research. The teacher's organisation of Rajshahi medical college publishes a bi-annual medical journal named 'TAJ' which is recognised by BMDC.

There are two hostels for male students. They are Shahid Muktijuddha Kaji Nurunnobbi hostel and Shahid Shah Mainul Ahsan Pinku hostel. Polin, Falguni and Ayesha Siddiqa are for female. Ayesha Siddiqa hostel was inaugurated in 2006. Shahid Jamil Akhtar Raton hostel is for male and another one for female internee doctors. There is a college bus for students which ply on different routes of the city regularly.

A canteen was opened firstly beside the hospital kitchen which was shifted to the north side of the pathology department in a tin shed room in 1963. Henceforth, in 1982 a brick-built one storied building was built instead of tin shed room. This canteen is now well known as "Charu Mamar Canteen". Moreover, another new canteen was launched beside Pinku hostel in 2006.

Hospital infrastructure
The three storied hospital building with 530 beds was launched in April 1965. Another new four storied building has been built in an empty space at the centre of main building which was inaugurated in 2012. The new building will provide 352 new beds, 6 operation theatres, one power substation and corridors to other buildings. It has a foundation of 10 stories. With this new building RMCH has now 862 beds.
To the north side of Operation Theater a building has been built for 10 bed ICU in 2012, moreover a burn unit and plastic surgery department was inaugurated in 2014 at the same building.  
Coronary care unit was set up in 1984. In 1990 this unit was modernised to open Cardiology department. In 2014 cardiology ward was extended and shifted to newly built four storied building. Coronary angiogram and pacemaker implantation are performed here regularly since 2007. 
Nephrology and Neurosurgery department was set up in 1991. Hemodialysis is being done here since 2004. Paediatric surgery and Neuromedicine department was launched respectively in 1993 and 1994. Cobalt-60 machine is available since 1996 for cancer treatment. 
Nuclear medicine department was set up here in 1969. OCC centre was opened in this hospital in 2002 to give medical and legal help to the oppressed women. CT scan and MRI have been launched in Radiology and Imaging department in 2005. Endoscopy and colonoscopy are done here since 2007. 
BDS course was launched here as dental unit in 1992. Nine students were admitted in first batch. New building has been built for dental college in old Sadar hospital. A decision to establish a dental college is in the cards.

Controversy
On 14 February 2018, ATM Enamul Zahir, an associate professor of University of Rajshahi, was assaulted by a group of intern doctors of Rajshahi Medical College on the hospital premises. The professor went to the hospital that night to visit a relative who was admitted there. Around 11:00 p.m., he unintentionally collided with a female intern doctor named Merry Priyanka. He and Priyanka then allegedly hurled abuse at each other. Priyanka then called up her fellow intern doctor Mirza Kamal Hossen. Kamal and the other intern doctors then rushed to the spot and beat up the professor. The professor had been heavily wounded and was admitted to the hospital. He was later admitted to a hospital in Dhaka. Students of University of Rajshahi held protests and demanded arrest and exemplary punishment for the intern doctors involved in the assault.

Notable alumni
 Quazi Tariqul Islam, physician and academic 
 Kedar Narsingh KC, Nepali physician, politician and social worker
 Major General Dr. Susane Giti, Highest-ranking female officer the Bangladesh Army
 Mamun Hossain, recognised as physician, psychiatrist & novelist. He won Bangla Academy Literary Award in 2017 in the category of fiction writer.

See also
 List of medical colleges in Bangladesh
List of dental schools in Bangladesh

References

External links
 

Medical colleges in Bangladesh
Hospitals in Bangladesh
Educational institutions established in 1958
1958 establishments in East Pakistan
Organisations based in Rajshahi